Kamień Pomorski (or Kammin) is a town in the West Pomeranian Voivodeship of north-western Poland, on the Baltic coast. It is the seat of an urban-rural gmina (administrative district) in Kamień County which lies approximately 63 km to the north of the regional capital Szczecin. It is the second seat of the Archdiocese of Szczecin-Kamień and the deanery of Kamień.

Kamień is the first known capital of the Duchy of Pomerania.

In 2015 the town had a population of 8,921 inhabitants.

Etymology and names 
The name of the town in English translates as "Pomeranian Stone". It has its origins in the Wendish language. The first mentions of the town appeared in the Life of Otton from Bamberg,Civitas ducis Camina by Herbord, Castrum magnum Gamin by Eb, and In urbe Games.
Other names are Chamin and Camyna. A bull of 14 October 1140 has the mention of Chamin cum taberna et foro. In a bull of 25 February 1188 there is apud civitated Camyn. Ultimately the name Camin was settled upon.

The name is associated with a massive glacial boulder (diameter of 20 m) situated in the Dziwna’s riverbed. This Royal Boulder has been used as a designator in ship transport.
Since 1959 the Royal Boulder has been protected as a natural monument.

There are three legends dealing with the Royal Boulder.

The first one says that in 1121 Duke Bolesław III Wrymouth stood on it and welcomed sailors’ parades.

The second one describes the origins of the Royal Boulder. The boulder was in fact a petrified toad that wreaked havoc in the Kamieński Bay. It was cursed by the Slovian god Trzygłów into a boulder.

The third one describes the story of a devil, banished from a dwelling nearby, that promised to find a suitable partner for a certain giant if it destroys said dwelling. Mistrustful giant wanted to see his future partner first and saw her he did. From the depth of the waters emerged a perfect match for the giant but in the exact moment a rooster crowed, the illusion of the future spouse was dropped and showed a devil. A furious giant threw into him a massive boulder. Devil wanted to run away and changed into a toad, but it was too late, the boulder crushed him and confines him to this day.

History 

The town's history dates back to a fishermen's settlement from the 10th and 11th centuries. The region became part of Poland soon after the creation of the state in the 10th century. As a result of the 12th-century fragmentation of Poland, it became part of the separate Duchy of Pomerania. The town became the seat of a bishopric in 1176 and a Pomeranian diocese. In 1180 a mint was established in Kamień. From time to time the Dukes of Pomerania would also reside in the town. By 1228 the Dominicans were involved in the town's religious affairs, and in 1274 it received Lübeck city rights.

Sweden acquired control of the town at the Peace of Westphalia ending the Thirty Years' War in 1648. Acquired by Brandenburg-Prussia in 1679, the town was made part of the Kingdom of Prussia in 1701. From then until 1945 it remained part of Prussia, and from 1871 to 1945 it was also part of Germany. It was administered as part of the Prussian Province of Pomerania.

In 1945, the town was part of the region that became part of Poland under border changes agreed upon at the Potsdam Conference.

Geography

Location 

Kamień Pomorski is located on in the pool of Dziwna’s strait that creates Kamieński Bay. The town lies by the two bays: Karpinka and Promna, approximately 90 km to Szczecin. Kamień Pomorski lies in north-west part of the West Pomeranian Voivodeship. The centre of the city is located about 7 km to the Baltic Sea, to which it has direct access.

Climate 

Moderately warm, oceanic climate (Cfb in the Köppen climate classification)
This climate is dominated all year round by the polar front, leading to changeable, often overcast weather. Summers are cool due to cool ocean currents, but winters are milder than other climates in similar latitudes, but usually very cloudy. 
Average temperature changes between 7-8,3 °C. August is the warmest month in the year, and January – the coldest. Max temperature is between 32,1 – 33,1 °C, and min. temperature is between -18,6- -19,2 °C. Annual precipitation rate ranges from 550 mm to 650 mm. Length of growing period is 210–220 days. Winds blow mostly from the South-West and North-West direction.

Tourism 

The town is close to Zalew Kamieński (Kamieński Bay). The Cathedral of St. John the Baptist is a local landmark. The cathedral is one of Poland's official national Historic Monuments (Pomnik historii), as designated September 1, 2005 and tracked by the National Heritage Board of Poland.

International relations

Kamień Pomorski is twinned with:

Notable residents 
Jaromar (c. 1267 – c. 1294) selected as Bishop of Cammin
Klaus Uebe (1900–1968), German Luftwaffe General 
Klausjürgen Wussow (1929–2007) a German stage, film and television actor
Uwe Johnson (1934–1984) a German writer, editor and scholar
Bogusław Mamiński (born 1955) a retired long-distance runner
Adrian Benedyczak (born 2000) a Polish professional football player

Gallery

See also
Bishopric of Cammin
Kamień Pomorski homeless hostel fire

References

External links

 

Cities and towns in West Pomeranian Voivodeship
Kamień County
Spa towns in Poland